Cowdenbeath is a constituency of the Scottish Parliament (Holyrood) covering part of the council area of Fife. It elects one Member of the Scottish Parliament (MSP) by the plurality (first past the post) method of election. It is one of nine constituencies in the Mid Scotland and Fife electoral region, which elects seven additional members, in addition to the nine constituency MSPs, to produce a form of proportional representation for the region as a whole.

The town of Cowdenbeath was formerly part of the Dunfermline East constituency which was abolished in 2011.

The current Member is Annabelle Ewing of the Scottish National Party, elected in 2016, following her defeat of Alex Rowley.

Electoral region 

The other eight constituencies of the Mid Scotland and Fife region are Clackmannanshire and Dunblane, Dunfermline, Kirkcaldy, Mid Fife and Glenrothes, North East Fife, Perthshire North, Perthshire South and Kinross-shire and Stirling.

The region covers all of the Clackmannanshire council area, all of the Fife council area, all of the Perth and Kinross council area and all of the Stirling council area.

Constituency boundaries and council area 

Fife is represented in the Scottish Parliament by five constituencies, Cowdenbeath, Dunfermline, Kirkcaldy, Mid Fife and Glenrothes and North East Fife.

The constituency of Cowdenbeath is formed from the following electoral wards, all of which are part of Fife:

In full:
Inverkeithing and Dalgety Bay
Cowdenbeath
Lochgelly, Cardenden and Benarty
In part:
Rosyth (shared with Dunfermline)

Member of the Scottish Parliament

Election results

2020s

2010s

Footnotes

External links

Scottish Parliament constituencies and regions from 2011
Politics of Fife
Rosyth
Cowdenbeath
Constituencies of the Scottish Parliament
Constituencies established in 2011
2011 establishments in Scotland
Inverkeithing
Kelty
Dalgety Bay
Lochgelly